Moreton Hall is a Grade II* listed building in Bury St Edmunds, a market town in the county of Suffolk, England. It was designed by the Scottish architect Robert Adam and built in 1773 as a country house for John Symonds (1729–1807), a clergyman and Professor of Modern History at Cambridge University. The building was originally known as "St. Edmund's Hill". It was later called "The Mount" and from 1890 "Moreton Hall".

School

From 1962, the building and surrounding 30 acres of parkland was used by the Moreton Hall Preparatory School, an independent co-educational preparatory school founded by Lady Miriam Fitzalan-Howard (daughter of Lord Howard of Glossop) and her husband Commander Peregrine Hubbard. Hubbard and Geoffrey de Guingand served jointly as the school's first headmasters. The Moreton Hall School Trust acquired the freehold to the building and parklands in 2009. It was affiliated with the Roman Catholic church but accepts all pupils regardless of denomination.
The school was divided into two sections: pre-prep and prep. The pre-prep took pupils from aged 2 years and 8 months to 7 years. Prep consisted of pupils in Years 3–8. Boarding was offered to pupils aged 8 and above.

The school closed permanently on 30 June 2020.

References

External links
History of Moreton Hall
Profile on the Independent Schools Council website

Grade II* listed buildings in Suffolk
Grade II* listed educational buildings
Robert Adam buildings
Buildings and structures in Suffolk
Defunct schools in Suffolk
Boarding schools in Suffolk
Roman Catholic private schools in the Diocese of East Anglia
Catholic boarding schools in England
Bury St Edmunds
Educational institutions established in 1962
1962 establishments in England
Educational institutions disestablished in 2020
2020 disestablishments in England